The bust of George Floyd is a sculpture of George Floyd (1973–2020), an African-American man who was murdered by a police officer during his arrest in Minneapolis. Initially situated in the Flatbush neighborhood of Brooklyn, New York, it is currently displayed in Union Square, Manhattan.

The sculpture sits on a marble base, with the  bust being made of layers of CNC-cut okoumé plywood. It was created by artist Chris Carnabuci and unveiled by Floyd's brother Terrence, as part of the 2021 Juneteenth federal holiday, saying "My brother was the sacrifice, so I need y'all to continue to pay attention and keep my big brother's name ringing in the ears of everyone." It was moved to Manhattan on 1 October 2021 and displayed next to busts of Breonna Taylor and John Lewis. Each bust is part of the See in Justice public art exhibition.

Vandalism 
The sculpture was vandalized days after it was unveiled with "PATRIOTFRONT.US", the website of Patriot Front, spray painted on the base of the sculpture. According to the Southern Poverty Law Center (SPLC), Patriot Front is a white nationalist hate group. On June 25, 2021, the New York City Police Department (NYPD) stated that they were investigating the incident as a hate crime.

Two days after it was moved to Union Square, the bust was vandalized with grey paint.

See also 
 Black Lives Matter art
 Memorials to George Floyd

References

2021 establishments in New York City
2021 sculptures
2020s in Brooklyn
African-American history in New York City
Black Lives Matter art
Busts in New York City
Memorials to George Floyd
Monuments and memorials in New York City
Relocated buildings and structures in New York City
Sculptures of African Americans
Sculptures of men in New York (state)
Vandalized works of art in New York City
Wooden sculptures in New York City